The Miss Idaho scholarship program is the pageant that selects the representative for the state of Idaho in the Miss America pageant. The current titleholder receives a $4,000 cash scholarship to any accredited institution of her choice.  She also represents the state of Idaho for the live ABC broadcast of the Miss America pageant.

Sarah Jensen of Weiser was crowned Miss Idaho 2022 on June 18, 2022 at the Colonial Theater in Idaho Falls. She competed for the title of Miss America 2023 at the Mohegan Sun in Uncasville, Connecticut in December 2022.

Results summary
The following is a visual summary of the past results of Miss Idaho titleholders at the national Miss America pageants/competitions. The year in parentheses indicates the year of the national competition during which a placement and/or award was garnered, not the year attached to the contestant's state title.

Placements 
 1st runners-up: Karen Herd (1972)
 Top 10: Marlene Coleman (1961), Nina Forest (2019)
 Top 15: Louise Fletchner (1939), Kylee Solberg (2017)
 Top 16: Sierra Sandison (2015)

Awards

Preliminary awards
 Preliminary Lifestyle and Fitness: Kristine Phillips (1968)

Non-finalist awards
 Non-finalist Talent: Carene Clark (1958), Bonnie Baird (1959), Judith Steubbe (1965), Rhonda Hammond (1966), Karen Ryder (1969), RaNae Peterson (1977), Kimberly Jensen (1979), Stephanie Kambitsch (1982), Elaine Pack (1984), Kendra Ruwe (1991), Sadie Quigley (2008), Whitney Wood (2013), Kalie Wright (2016)
 Non-finalist Interview: Rebecca Trueblood (1990), Elizabeth Barchas (2005)

Other awards
 America's Choice: Sierra Sandison (2015)
 Miss Congeniality: Grace Zimmerman (2020)
 Four Points Award: Genevieve Nutting (2012), Whitney Wood (2013), Sarah Downs (2014)
 Louanne Gamba Instrumental Award: Whitney Wood (2013)
 Quality of Life Award Winners: Tracey Brown (2006)
 Quality of Life Award 1st runners-up: Brooke Gambrell (1996), Elizabeth Barchas (2005)
 Quality of Life Award Finalists: Whitney Wood (2013)
 Women in Business Scholarship Award Finalists: Grace Zimmerman (2020)

Winners

Note

References

External links
 Official website

Idaho culture
Idaho
Women in Idaho
Annual events in Idaho